The 1978 Alitalia Florence Open was a men's tennis tournament played on outdoor clay courts in Florence, Italy that was part of the 1978 Colgate-Palmolive Grand Prix circuit. It was the sixth edition of the tournament and was played from 15 May until 21 May 1978. Unseeded José Luis Clerc won the singles title.

Finals

Singles
 José Luis Clerc defeated  Patrice Dominguez 6–4, 6–2, 6–1
 It was Clerc's first singles title of his career.

Doubles
 Corrado Barazzutti /  Adriano Panatta defeated  Mark Edmondson /  John Marks 6–3, 6–7, 6–3

References

External links
 ITF tournament edition details

Alitalia Florence Open
Alitalia Florence Open
ATP Florence